Zarrineh (also Romanized as Zarrīneh) is a city and capital of Karaftu District, in Divandarreh County, Kurdistan Province, Iran. At the 2006 census, its population was 1,272, in 266 families. The city is populated by Kurds.

References

Towns and villages in Divandarreh County
Cities in Kurdistan Province
Kurdish settlements in Kurdistan Province